Yang Changpeng  (born May 1, 1989) is a Chinese footballer.

Club career
Yang Changpeng was scouted by Xiao Duyin, by-then youth coach of Wuhan Optics Valley youth team, when he was coaching his team for pre-season at Hainan Province. By then 15 years old, Yang Changpeng has left hometown Wuhan for 3 years looking for chance at Guangdong and then Hainan, before finally earning a chance back home. In October 2006, already 2 metres high he was scouted by Bolton Wanderers and invited to a one-month trial at England where he was dubbed 'China's Peter Crouch' by the British media due to his extremely tall stature. On his return from Britain he eventually  graduated to their senior side and make his debut for them in a league game on September 20, 2008 against Shaanxi CSCE.

However his time at Wuhan was suddenly cut short when the club had a dispute with the Chinese Football Association after the club's management did not accept the punishment given to them by the Chinese Football Association after a scuffle broke out during a league game against Beijing Guoan on September 27, 2008 and decided to pull out of the league and then dissolved, which saw all of the first team loaned or sold off.

Being a promising youngster Yang was loaned out to third tier team CTGU before the start of the 2009 season. After his loan ended, Hubei Greenery, Wuhan Optics Valley's successor tried to buy back the contracts of many of Wuhan's players, which included Yang, however in July 2010 he transferred to second tier club Chengdu Blades. At his new club he sat on the bench while Chengdu won promotion to the top tier at the end of the 2010 Chinese league one season, however Yang was eventually given his chance within the team the following season when he made his debut for the club on May 22, 2011 in a league game against Qingdao Jonoon in a 0-0 draw.

After 2011 season Yang Changpeng became a free agent and went for various trails and ended up at Shenzhen with newly founded Shenzhen Fengpeng. He finally found himself a starting position in senior level and provided constant tactical point as target man using his extraordinary height. But in the key semi-final of post-season play-offs against Hubei China-Kyle, Yang Chengpeng was wrongly sent off after being brought down by opposition player, which turned to be a watershed that lost the promotion for Fengpeng.

In March 2015, Yang transferred to fellow China League Two side Yinchuan Helanshan. In February 2017, Yang transferred to Super League side Henan Jianye. He made his debut for Henan on March 5, 2017, in a 0–0 home draw against Hebei China Fortune, coming on as a substitute for Zhong Jinbao in the 62nd minute.

Career statistics 
.

References

External links
Player stats at Sohu.com

1989 births
Living people
Footballers from Wuhan
Chinese footballers
Wuhan Optics Valley F.C. players
Chengdu Tiancheng F.C. players
Meizhou Hakka F.C. players
Henan Songshan Longmen F.C. players
Chinese Super League players
China League One players
China League Two players
Association football forwards